Ophioparma ventosa is a species of lichen belonging to the family Ophioparmaceae.

It has cosmopolitan distribution.

Synonym:
 Lichen ventosus L. (= basionym)
 Haematomma ventosum (L.) A.Massal.

References

Lichen species
Umbilicariales